Bucculatrix statica is a moth in the family Bucculatricidae. It is found on Java. It was first described by Edward Meyrick in 1921.

References

Natural History Museum Lepidoptera generic names catalog

Bucculatricidae
Moths described in 1921
Taxa named by Edward Meyrick
Moths of Indonesia